Osówka may refer to the following places:
Osówka, Kuyavian-Pomeranian Voivodeship (north-central Poland)
Osówka, Bielsk County in Podlaskie Voivodeship (north-east Poland)
Osówka, Hajnówka County in Podlaskie Voivodeship (north-east Poland)
Osówka, Lublin Voivodeship (east Poland)
Osówka, Świętokrzyskie Voivodeship (south-central Poland)
Osówka, Lipsko County in Masovian Voivodeship (east-central Poland)
Osówka, Sierpc County in Masovian Voivodeship (east-central Poland)
Osówka, Żuromin County in Masovian Voivodeship (east-central Poland)
Osówka, Greater Poland Voivodeship (west-central Poland)